Moore County is a county located in the U.S. state of North Carolina. As of the 2020 census, its population was 99,727.

Its county seat is Carthage and its largest municipality is the Village of Pinehurst. It is a border county between the Piedmont and the Atlantic Coastal Plain.

In the early years, the economy was dependent on agriculture and lumber. The lumber business expanded after railroads reached the area, improving access to markets. It lies at the northern edge of the area known as the Sandhills region, and developed resorts in the late 19th century, aided by railroads.

Since the early 21st century, Moore County comprises the Aberdeen-Pinehurst-Southern Pines, North Carolina Micropolitan Statistical Area. Moore County is a part of the Fayetteville Combined Statistical Area, which as of 2019 had an estimated population of 854,826, making it the 65th largest CSA in the United States.

History
Indigenous peoples occupied this area, with varying cultures over thousands of years. In the historic period that included European encounter, tribes included Algonquian-speaking tribes, Siouan-speaking tribes and the Iroquoian-speaking Cherokee in the western mountains.

This area was settled by Gaels from the Scottish Highlands and Islands and their descendants. The Loyalist war poet Iain mac Mhurchaidh, a member of Clan Macrae from Kintail and a major figure in Scottish Gaelic literature, purchased 150 acres in Moore County in 1775.

The county was formed in 1785, shortly after the American Revolutionary War, from part of Cumberland County.  It was named after Alfred Moore, an officer in the American Revolutionary War and associate justice of the Supreme Court of the United States.

In 1907 parts of Moore and Chatham counties were combined to form Lee County.

Moore County has many golf resorts in the Southern Pines/Pinehurst area, and hosted the 1996 and 2001 Women's U.S. Opens, as well as the 1999 and 2005 Men's U.S. Opens. The Women's Open returned to Southern Pines in 2007. In 2014, they consecutively hosted both the Women's and Men's Opens in the same year, a first in U.S. Open history.

Geography

State and local protected areas/sites 
 House in the Horseshoe
 Sandhills Game Land (part)
 Weymouth Woods-Sandhills Nature Preserve

Major water bodies 

 Aberdeen Creek (Drowning Creek tributary)
 Auman Lake
 Big Governors Creek
 Crane Creek (Little River tributary)
 Deep Creek
 Deep River
 Drowning Creek
 Dunhams Creek
 Horse Creek
 Jackson Creek
 Killets Creek
 Lake Surf
 Little Governors Creek
 Little River (Cape Fear River tributary)
 McLendons Creek
 Pagers Lake
 Pinehurst Lake
 Richland Creek
 Thagards Lake
 Watson Lake
 Wolf Creek

Adjacent counties

 Chatham County - north
 Lee County - northeast
 Harnett County - east
 Cumberland County - southeast
 Hoke County - southeast
 Scotland County - south
 Richmond County - southwest
 Montgomery County - west
 Randolph County - north

Major highways

Major infrastructure 
 Gilliam - McConnell Airfield, small local airfield located in the county
 Moore County Airport
 Southern Pines Station

Demographics

2020 census

As of the 2020 United States census, there were 99,727 people, 41,530 households, and 27,191 families residing in the county.  The population density was 107 people per square mile (41/km2).  There were 48,237 housing units at an average density of 50 per square mile (19/km2).

2000 census
There were 30,713 households, out of which 26.70% had children under the age of 18 living with them, 58.10% were married couples living together, 10.20% had a female householder with no husband present, and 28.50% were non-families. 24.90% of all households were made up of individuals, and 11.30% had someone living alone who was 65 years of age or older.  The average household size was 2.38 and the average family size was 2.81.

In the county, the population was spread out, with 21.2% under the age of 18, 6.60% from 18 to 24, 25.80% from 25 to 44, 23.80% from 45 to 64, and 23.4% who were 65 years of age or older.  The median age was 42 years. For every 100 females there were 93.00 males.  For every 100 females age 18 and over, there were 89.80 males.

The median income for a household in the county was $48,348, and the median income for a family was $48,492. Males had a median income of $31,260 versus $23,526 for females. The per capita income for the county was $23,377.  About 8.00% of families and 11.40% of the population were below the poverty line, including 16.60% of those under age 18 and 10.10% of those age 65 or over.

By 2005 78.0% of the county population was non-Hispanic whites. 5.1% of the population was Latino. 14.8% of the population was African-American.

Government and politics
Since the late 1960s and the civil rights movement and other cultural changes, Moore has become a supporter of Republican presidential candidates. It was one of the first counties east of the Blue Ridge to turn Republican, having supported the GOP nominee in all but one election from 1952 onward. The last Democrat to carry the county was Lyndon B. Johnson in 1964, and Jimmy Carter in 1980 was the last to reach forty percent of the vote. The Republican Party also dominates many local and state elections in majority-white precincts and districts.

Moore County is a member of the regional Triangle J Council of Governments. In the North Carolina House of Representatives, Moore County lies chiefly in the 52nd District, represented by Republican Deputy Majority Whip James L. Boles Jr. The northwestern part of the county lies within the 78th District, which also covers the southeastern part of Randolph County and is represented by Republican Allen McNeill. In the North Carolina Senate, Moore County lies entirely within the 29th Senate District represented by Majority Whip Jerry W. Tillman.

The North Carolina Department of Juvenile Justice and Delinquency Prevention previously operated the Samarkand Youth Development Center (YDC), a correctional facility for delinquent girls, in Eagle Springs. The  complex first opened in 1918 and did not have a fence.

Attractions and places of interest 
 Fort Bragg, a large military installation centered in neighboring Cumberland County, also has portions in Moore County.
 Occoneechee Scout Reservation, site of Camp Durant (with facilities) and Camp Reeves (primitive) campgrounds.  Located 9 miles west of Carthage.
 Pinehurst Race Track, a horse-racing track
 Pinehurst Resort, historic golf resort
 Moore County Courthouse, historic Renaissance Revival courthouse building located in Carthage
 Pottery Road, extending from Randolph County, known for a large number of potteries.
 Weymouth Woods-Sandhills Nature Preserve, located near Southern Pines.

Communities

City
 Robbins

Towns
 Aberdeen
 Cameron
 Carthage (county seat)
 Pinebluff
 Southern Pines
 Taylortown
 Vass

Villages
 Foxfire
 Pinehurst (largest village)
 Whispering Pines

Census-designated places
 Seven Lakes

Unincorporated communities
 Eagle Springs
 Glendon
 Jackson Springs
 Manly
 West End

Townships
The county is divided into ten townships, which are both numbered and named:

 1 (Carthage)
 2 (Bensalem)
 3 (Sheffields)
 4 (Ritter)
 5 (Deep River)
 6 (Greenwood)
 7 (McNeill)
 8 (Sandhill)
 9 (Mineral Springs)
 10 (Little River)

Notable people
 Charles Brady (1951- 2006), was raised here. He became a physician, career Navy officer, and NASA astronaut.
 John Edwards, politician, US Senator and former presidential candidate was raised here
 Jeff Hardy and Matt Hardy, brothers, were raised here; they are professional wrestlers currently working in All Elite Wrestling as The Hardy Boyz.
 Shannon Moore, was raised here; he is a wrestler currently working in the Independent Circuit.
Shanann Watts, murdered with her two daughters by her husband Chris in Colorado in 2018

See also 
 List of counties in North Carolina
 National Register of Historic Places listings in Moore County, North Carolina
 North Carolina State Parks
 Moore County substation attack

References

External links

 
 
 Moore County Chamber of Commerce
 Moore County Historical Association
 Moore County NC History 
 Go Sandhills History
 NCGenWeb Moore County - free genealogy resources for the county

 
1784 establishments in North Carolina
Populated places established in 1784